Culicoides ronderosae is a species of Culicoides.

References

ronderosae
Insects described in 2004